Matai Akinmboni (born October 17, 2006) is an American soccer player who plays as a defender for D.C. United in Major League Soccer.

Club career
Akinmboni is a central defender who plays for D.C. United's USL affiliate Loudoun United while training at the D.C. United Academy. His first professional action was on March 27, 2022, coming on as a substitute in the last four minutes of a Loudoun match against The Miami FC.  He trained for two weeks with FC Bayern Munich in 2021, and was reported to have received "contractual terms" from the club, but ultimately did not join them.

On August 31, 2022, Akinmboni was signed by D.C. United to a homegrown contract with the first team. On the same day, Akinmboni was part of the team's gameday roster against NYCFC, but was not called to take the field for that game. His first action with D.C. United would come on September 10, 2022, when he was given a starting spot and played the entire first half of a match against Real Salt Lake that ended in a 0-0 draw.

International career
Akinmboni was born in the USA, but through his parentage, is also eligible to play for the senior teams of Nigeria or Ghana. On August 16, 2022, he was called up to the United States men's national under-17 soccer team.

Personal life
Akinmboni is the nephew of retired Ghanaian footballer Sammy Kuffour.

References

External links

2006 births
Living people
American soccer players
American people of Ghanaian descent
American people of Nigerian descent
Loudoun United FC players
D.C. United players
USL Championship players
Homegrown Players (MLS)
Major League Soccer players